"Different Sense" is the 27th single by Japanese heavy metal band Dir En Grey, released on June 22, 2011 in Japan in a regular and limited edition, the limited copy featuring a bonus DVD. It is the third single taken from the band's eighth studio album, Dum Spiro Spero. It peaked at #5 at the Oricon weekly charts.

The first B-side, "Tsumi to Kisei", is a remake of the song "Tsumi to Batsu" from the band's first album, Gauze. The second B-side is a live recording of the song "Red Soil", from the band's seventh album, Uroboros, recorded on November 9, 2010, at NAMBA Hatch. The DVD included in the limited edition features scenes from the recording of "Different Sense".

Track listing

CD

DVD

References

2011 singles
Dir En Grey songs
Songs written by Kyo (musician)
2011 songs